Bordj-Bou-Djadi is an archaeological site and former Catholic diocese located on the outskirts of Tunis, Tunisia. The area is situated near Ucres, at 36.901123n, 9.97083e. It is now a Latin Catholic titular see.

History 

The stone ruins at Bordj-Bou-Djadi have been tentatively identified with the Roman–Berber town of Ucres, a civitas of the Roman province of Africa Proconsularis, important enough to become one of the many suffragans of Carthage, the Metropolitan at its capital. It flourished from 30BC until around 640AD.

Several of its bishops are known from antiquity:
 Vitalis fl. 314, participant at the Council of Arles in 314 which condemned Donatism as heresy.
 Victor fl. 404, whose son left an epitaph in Rome
 Maximinus participated in the Council of Carthage in 411 with other Catholic and Donatist bishops, including his schismatic counterpart Vitalis, 411
 Quoduultdeus fl. 416–429, participated in the Council of Carthage in 419 on appeals to Rome
 Exitiosus fl. 484, participated in the Council of Carthage called in 484 by king Huneric of the Vandal Kingdom, after which he was exiled, like most Catholic bishops.

Titular see 
The ancient diocese was nominally restored in 1933 as Latin titular bishopric of the Roman Catholic Church, as Ucres (Latin and Curiate Italian) / Ucren(sis) (Latin adjective)/

It has had the following incumbents, so far of the fitting Episcopal (lowest) rank:
 Franz Hoowaarts, Vocationists (S.V.D.) (1934.11.12 – 1946.04.11) as only Apostolic Vicar of Caozhoufu 曹州府 (China) (1934.11.12 – 1946.04.11), promoted first Bishop of Caozhou 曹州 (Tsaochowfu, China) (1946.04.11 – death 1954.03.24)
 Bernard Denis Stewart (1946.12.12 – 1950.08.18) as Coadjutor Bishop of Sandhurst (Australia) (1946.12.12 – 1950.08.18), succeeded as (first native) Bishop of Sandhurst (1950.08.18 – retired 1979.04.21); died 1988
 Antônio Batista Fragoso (1957.03.13 – 1964.04.28) as Auxiliary Bishop of São Luís do Maranhão (Brazil) (1957.03.13 – 1964.04.28), later Bishop of Crateús (Brazil) (1964.04.28 – retired 1998.02.18); died 2006
 Antulio Parrilla-Bonilla, Jesuits (S.J.) (1965.05.25 – death 1994.01.03) as Auxiliary Bishop of Caguas (Puerto Rico, US) (1965.05.25 – retired 1968) and on emeritate
 Guillermo Rodríguez Melgarejo (1994.06.25 – 2003.05.30) as Auxiliary Bishop of Buenos Aires (Argentina) (1994.06.25 – 2003.05.30); later Bishop of San Martín (Argentina) (2003.05.30 – ...) 
 Edgar Moreira da Cunha, Divine Word Missionaries (S.D.V.) (2003.06.27 – 2014.07.03) as Auxiliary Bishop of Newark (New Jersey, USA) (2003.06.27 – 2014.07.03), later Bishop of Fall River (USA) (2014.07.03 – ...)
 Roy Edward Campbell (2017.03.08 – ...), Auxiliary Bishop of Washington (DC, USA) (2017.03.08 – ...).

See also 
 List of Catholic dioceses in Tunisia

References

Sources and external links 
 GCatholic (titular) bishopric
 Bibliography
 J. Mesnage, L'Afrique chrétienne, Paris 1912, pp. 51–52

Ucres
Ucres
Ancient Berber cities
Catholic titular sees in Africa